The 2018 Star Nursery 100 was a NASCAR K&N Pro Series West race held at the Las Vegas Motor Speedway Dirt Track in Las Vegas, Nevada. The event marked the first K&N Pro Series race on a dirt track since 1979. Sheldon Creed won the race, followed by Bill McAnally Racing's Hailie Deegan and Sunrise Ford Racing's Derek Thorn in second and third respectively.

References

Star Nursery 100
Star Nursery 100
NASCAR races at Las Vegas Motor Speedway
Star Nursery 100